The Steve Jobs Theater is an underground auditorium complex located at Apple Park in Cupertino, California. It is named after the co-founder and former CEO of Apple, Steve Jobs, and is situated atop a hill at one of the highest points in Apple Park. The auditorium is intended for Apple product launches and press meets and can seat 1,000 people.

Architecture 
The theater includes a 42-foot (13 m) high glass elevator that rotates 171 degrees from the bottom floor to the upper lobby level. The elevator is made from chemically tempered glass and is considered to be the tallest free-standing, glass elevator in the world. There is only a single door due to its ability to rotate.

The lobby has a lens-shaped roof composed of 44 identical carbon-fiber radial panels, weighing in total 80.7 tons (73.2 metric tons), that sits on a 22ft (6.6 m) tall and 135ft (41.1m) diameter glass cylinder. There are no support columns in place. All of the wires and pipes, such as electric conduits and sprinkler pipes, are positioned within the silicone joints between the curved glass panels.

History 
On October 15, 2013, Cupertino City Council unanimously approved Apple's plans for the new campus after a six-hour debate. Shortly thereafter, demolition work began to prepare the site for construction.

On February 22, 2017, Apple announced the official name of the campus as the "Apple Park", and the auditorium to be named the "Steve Jobs Theater".

On September 12, 2017, Apple publicly opened the newly completed theater at their event titled "Let's meet at our place." At the event, the Apple Watch Series 3, Apple TV 4K, iPhone 8 and 8 Plus, and iPhone X were announced.

References 


Apple Inc.
Buildings and structures in Santa Clara County, California
Cupertino, California
Steve Jobs
Auditoriums in the United States